Lorraine Leckie (née Turansky), is a New York City based Canadian singer and songwriter.  She performs solo and with her Brooklyn-based psychedelic rock band Lorraine Leckie & Her Demons.

Biography
Lorraine Leckie was born and raised in Whitby, Ontario, near Toronto, with her sister Brenda Turansky and brother Paul Turansky (deceased).  In her early years, she was surrounded by the music of Neil Young and The Rolling Stones, but in the seventies she converted to punk rock, married Steve Leckie of The Viletones, and started her career as a makeup artist in the fashion industry. After a decade of working in Europe, she put down roots in New York City and began working with celebrity clients such as Paul McCartney, Claudia Schiffer, Carla Bruni, and Heidi Klum. By the age of 37, Leckie changed her style to that of a guitar and started performing by the age of 40. Leckie earned her title as the Lower East Side folk noir troubadour playing venues such as Bowery Ballroom, Webster Hall & Mercury Lounge, often joined by her Rock band, Her Demons.

Lorraine Leckie & Her Demons released their first full-length album, 'Four Cold Angels,' in 2008, a deeply rooted rock album with grungy guitar and heavy-hitting drums.  'Four Cold Angels' was rated on The Village Voice's Pazz and Jop 2008 list, and the song "Ontario" was on Pazz & Jop 2009.  Anton Newcombe of Brian Jonestown Massacre collaborated and sang with Leckie on a cover of the Pogues’ “Dirty Old Town” for the album.  The song went on to become the featured title track for the acclaimed 2011 film 'Dirty Old Town' directed by Jenner Furst. The film is an ode to the Lower East Side starring Billy LeRoy, the actor and Leckie's current husband.

A departure from her rock n' roll debut, Leckie released her solo album, Martini Eyes, in New York on September 29, 2010.

Leckie's next album, 'Rudely Interrupted' was a collaboration with Anthony Haden-Guest.  Drawing inspiration from Haden-Guest's book of cartoons and verses, "In  The Mean Time." 'Rudely Interrupted' was released in New York on November 12, 2012 at the Mercury Lounge.

In 2014, Leckie released Rebel Devil Devil Rebel, her third album and second  with a full band. Receiving positive response: the Huffington Post called Leckie a "Noir folk rock goddess", and No Depression characterized it as "A sonic rave-up worthy of Neil's Crazy Horse."

Leckie's next album, The Raven Smiled, was released in 2015, a spare collaboration with Czech violinist Pavel Cingl. Critics responded favorably: both Modern Folk and New Canadian Music compared the chemistry between the two musicians to the rapport between Nick Cave and Warren Ellis, while the blog Days of Purple and Orange called it "utterly bewitching."

In 2018, Leckie released Live at Mercury Lounge NYC, the final concert played by drummer Paul Triff, who died shortly thereafter the show. New York Music Daily ranked the album among the fifty best of the year.

Leckie's latest album, Razor Wing Butterfly, was released on June 26, 2020.

Discography

References

External links
 LorraineLeckie.com

Living people
Year of birth missing (living people)